The Brazil U-20 women's national soccer team is a youth soccer team operated under the Brazilian Football Confederation.  Its primary role is the development of players in preparation for the Brazil women's national football team. In the history of u-20 national team, the Brazilians won all editions of the South American Under-20 Women's Football Championship 2004, 2006, 2008, 2010, 2012, 2014, 2015, 2018, and 2022.

The best placement of the Brazil U-20 in the FIFA U-20 Women's World Cup was in 2006, at the time the Brazilians won the bronze medal.

History

2006
In 2006, the Brazil U-20 team played in 2006 FIFA U-20 Women's World Championship in Russia; however, the team finished in third place. They beat United States and became third in this tournament. Many members of that 2006 team have made appearances for the senior national team.

Fixtures and results

 Legend

2022

 Fixtures and results (Brazil Under 20) – Soccerway.com

Current squad
The following players were named to the squad for the 2022 FIFA U-20 Women's World Cup on 27 July 2022. On 1 August, Gio Queiroz withdrew and was replaced by Mileninha.

Caps and goals as of 11 August 2022, after the match against .

Competitive record

FIFA U-20 Women's World Cup

South American Under-20 Women's Football Championship

See also
 Brazil women's national football team
 Brazil women's national under-17 football team

References

National youth sports teams of Brazil
Youth football in Brazil
South American women's national under-20 association football teams